The Chamar Regiment was an infantry regiment formed by the British during World War II. Raised on 1 March 1943, the regiment was initially assigned to the 268th Indian Infantry Brigade. The regiment was disbanded in 1946.

History 
The Regiment Raised on 1 March 1943, the regiment was initially assigned to the 268th Indian Infantry Brigade, which was part of 43rd Armoured Division in July 1943 and when the division was broken up to form the 44th Armoured Division  the Chamar Regiment was included in the new division. During this time the regiment did not take part in any fighting.

World War II 
Later, the Chamar Regiment became part of 23rd Indian Infantry Division. In mid-1944, the regiment's 1st Battalion was committed to the Burma Campaign to fight against Imperial Japanese Army in Nagaland. The fighting lasted over three months, during which time the regiment took part in the  Battle of Kohima.

The Chamar regiment distinguished itself in the field of battle. It was part of the force that lifted the siege of Imphal and advanced against the Imperial army by liberating Burma along with other units of the army. They also took part in the assault on  Kamo, Tokyo, Imphal, Mandla, Burma, Rangoon and cleared the city of Japanese troops. By mid 1945 the Chamar regiment had helped free entire Burma from Japanese occupation. The dropping of the Atomic bombs on Japan , brought about the surrender of Japan. The Indian army accepted the surrender of Japanese troops in SE Asia> Chamar Regiment defeated Japan on LAND and United States of America defeated Japan on SEA and AIR.

Engagements 
●  Battel of Kohima 

● Battel of Kamo  

● Battel  of Tokyo 

● Battle of Imphal 

● Battel of Mandla

● Battel of Rangoon

● Battel of Singapore 

● Battle of Burma

Awards and decorations 

 5 British Empire Medal
 3 Military Medal
 3 Military Cross
 4 Pacific Star 
 7 Burma Star
 4 War Medal
 26 Mentioned in dispatches
 1 battle honour

Battle honour

World War II 
Battle of Kohima 1944, 1st chamar

Disbandment 
During the 2nd world war, the British Indian Government  pitted the Chamar Regiment against the Japanese Imperial Army and Indian National Army, headed by Mutaguchi Renya and Netaji Subhash Chandra Bose. Many Indian Prisoners of War before first March 1943 (formation of Chamar Regiment) joined Netaji; the most prominent member from the Chamar Regiment was Captain Mohan Lal Kureel. However British Indian Army never faced defeat since formation of Chamar Regiment, i.e. 1 March 1943. 

In 1946  the regiment denied to fight against subash chandra bose headed Indian national party that led to its disbanding by the British government.. However On 15 August 1945, Japan surrendered, with the surrender documents finally signed at Tokyo Bay on the deck of the American battleship USS Missouri on 2 September 1945, ending the war.

Since then, many Dalit and non-Dalit leaders like Chandrasekhar Azad Ravan, RJD leader Raghuvansh Prasad Singh, Congress lawmaker Udit Raj, and Rajesh Bagha, the Chairman of Punjab S.C Commission, have suggested that the Chamar Regiment be re-raised.

References 

British Indian Army infantry regiments
Military units and formations established in 1943
Military units and formations disestablished in 1946
Indian World War II regiments

the Chamar Regiment became part of [[23rd Infantry Division (India)|23rd Indian Infantry Division]]. In mid-1944, the regiment's 1st Battalion was committed to the [[Burma campaign 1944–45|Burma Campaign]] to fight against [[Imperial Japanese Army]] in [[Nagaland]].<ref>{{Cite web|url=https://hindi.news18.com/news/delhi/story-of-chamar-regiment-army-day-british-army-ina-dlop-1654131.html|title=चमार रेजीमेंट ने क्यों किया था ब्रिटिश आर्मी और अंग्रेजों से विद्रोह...!|date=2019-01-
On August 23, 1945, Tokyo Radio reported that Bose was arriving in Saigon on a large bomber plane when his plane crashed near Taihoku (Japanese language: 臺北帝國大學, Taihoku Teikoku Daigaku) airport on August 18. Japanese General Shodei, Pilot and some others were killed on board the plane. Netaji was seriously burnt. He was taken to Taihoku Sainik Hospital where he succumbed to his injuries. According to Col. Habibur Rahman, his last rites were performed in Taihoku. In mid-September, their bones were stored and placed in the Rankoji Temple in Tokyo, the capital of Japan. According to a document received from the National Archives of India, Netaji died on August 18, 1945 at 21.00 pm at Sainik Hospital in Taihoku.